Mundera is a Village of Tanda, Ambedkar Nagar, Uttar Pradesh. Mundera is Tehsil of Baskhari and belongs to Faizabad division. Mundera is administered by Akbarpur, which is 35 km away.

Transportation
There is no railway station within 35 km of Mundera. However, the Akbarpur Junction Railway is 35 km away and a major station, the Basti Railway Station, is 60 km away.

Demographics
As of 2011 India census Mundera had a population of 5,026. Males constitute 53% of the population and females 47%.There are 710 houses in Mundera.

Weather
Mundera of climate of summer (March to July) temperatures can range from 30 to 40 degrees Celsius. Winter climate (November to January) temperatures can range from 10 to 20 degrees Celsius.

See also

List of villages in India

References

Villages in Ambedkar Nagar district